Kolkwitz station is a railway station in the municipality of Kolkwitz, located in the Spree-Neiße district in Brandenburg, Germany.

References

Railway stations in Brandenburg
Railway stations in Germany opened in 1878
1878 establishments in Prussia
Buildings and structures in Spree-Neiße